Esselborn is an Ortsgemeinde – a municipality belonging to a Verbandsgemeinde, a kind of collective municipality – in the Alzey-Worms district in Rhineland-Palatinate, Germany.

Geography 

The municipality lies in Rhenish Hesse.

History 
In 763, Esselborn had its first documentary mention. Held at first by the Lords of Strahlenberg, Esselborn was then an Electoral Palatinate possession as of 1408.

Politics

Town council 
The council is made up of 8 council members, who were elected at the municipal election held on 7 June 2009, and the honorary mayor as chairman.

The municipal election held on 7 June 2009 yielded the following results:

In 2004 there was an election by majority vote.

Coat of arms 
The municipality's arms might be described thus: Argent two batons per saltire gules, the one in bend sinister surmounting the other, fastened thereto with a nail, and with a branch couped palewise in base dexter, in base a rose twig vert with one rose of the second barbed and seeded proper.

References

External links 
Esselborn in the collective municipality’s Web pages 
Esselborn hat jetzt seinen siebten Brunnen – Vermutlich bis 1902 wurde aus Vorgänger Wasser zum Brotbacken geschöpft / Zehn sollen es werden from the Rhein Main Presse of 28 July 2008 

Rhenish Hesse
Alzey-Worms